Pankaj Kumar Mullick (10 May 1905 – 19 February 1978) was an Indian music composer, playback singer and actor, who was a pioneer of film music in Bengali cinema and Hindi cinema at the advent of playback singing, as well as an early exponent of Rabindra Sangeet.

He was awarded the Padma Shri in 1970, followed by the Dadasaheb Phalke Award (India's highest award in cinema, given by the Government of India) in 1972 for lifetime contribution to Indian cinema.

Early life and training
Pankaj Kumar Mullick was born in Kolkata to Monimohan and Monomohini Mullick. His father Monimohan had a deep interest in traditional Bengali music. He started his early training in Indian classical music under the tutelage of Durgadas Bandyopadhyaya. He studied at the Scottish Church College of the University of Calcutta. An important turning point in his life came when, after finishing his studies, he came in contact with Dinendranath Tagore, who was Rabindranath Tagore's grand-nephew.  This led to Pankaj Mullick's lasting interest in Rabindra Sangeet. Rabindranath Tagore, in turn, grew fond of him, and soon Mullick became known as one of the leading exponents of Tagore's songs.

Career
Tagore's song Nemecche Aaj Prothom Badal became his first commercial recording, with the Kolkata-based Videophone Company in 1926, at the age of twenty one. This was the first of many albums which made him a household name in Rabindra sangeet.

He started his career with the Indian Broadcasting Corporation in Calcutta in 1927, the forerunner of All India Radio (AIR), along with composer R. C. Boral, where he contributed as a music director and artist for nearly fifty years. Apart from composing songs for movies, he also composed the programme called Mahishashur Mardini. This program was based on the triumph Maa Durga over the demon Mahishashur. The programme included Chandi Path by Birendra Krishna Bhadra and agomoni songs by various singers. This programme gained such a huge popularity that till date, the recorded version of this programme is played by All India Radio on the day of Mahalaya at 4:00 am.

He contributed in various capacities to Bengali, Hindi, Urdu and Tamil language films for 38 years, starting in 1931.  He worked as music director to artists like K.L. Saigal, S.D. Burman, Hemanta Mukherjee, Geeta Dutt and Asha Bhosle. He acted with famous film actors like K L Saigal, P.C. Barua and Kanan Devi. Along with Nitin Bose and his renowned sound engineer brother Mukul Bose, Mullick introduced playback singing in Indian cinema.

He worked with one of the early film studios, New Theatres Calcutta for 25 years.

Legacy

The Indian Postal Service released a postage stamp on his birth centenary in 2006 on 4 August, and on 10 May, Doordarshan, India's state television channel, telecast a special music programme to commemorate the occasion. Five decades earlier, it was he and Bharatanatyam danseuse Vyjayanthimala who were lead performers at the nationwide launch of the channel in 1959.

Filmography

Works
 Aamar Jug Aamar Gaan (Bengali). Firma KLM Pvt Ltd., Calcutta 1980.

See also
 Indian film music directors

References

External links

 
 http://pankajmullick.com/ : A comprehensive resource centre for research and documentation of Pankaj Mullick songs & related memorabilia
 

1905 births
1978 deaths
Scottish Church College alumni
Bengali singers
Bollywood playback singers
Dadasaheb Phalke Award recipients
Bengali playback singers
Indian male playback singers
Indian male singer-songwriters
Singers from Kolkata
Rabindra Sangeet exponents
Recipients of the Padma Shri in arts
University of Calcutta alumni
Hindi film score composers
20th-century Indian male singers
20th-century Indian singers
Indian male film score composers